Immermann-Preis was a literary prize of Germany.

List of laureates 
'Old' Immermann-Preis 1936–43(?)
 1936: Albert Bauer, Hermann Stahl
 1942: Wilhelm Schäfer

'New' Immermann-Preis past 1947
 1948: Emil Barth
 1953: Georg Britting; Sponsorship award: Otto Heinrich Kühner
 1954: Ernst Penzoldt
 1955: Ilse Aichinger
 1956: Sponsorship award: Rolf Schroers (for Jakob und die Sehnsucht)
 1957: Marie Luise Kaschnitz; Sponsorship award: Otto Heinrich Kühner
 1958: Wolfdietrich Schnurre (Berlin); Sponsorship award: Hans Peter Keller (Büttgen bei Neuss)
 1959: Gerd Gaiser (Reutlingen); Sponsorship award: Christoph Meckel (St. Gallen)
 1960: Eckart Peterich
 1961: Sponsorship award: Heinrich Schirmbeck
 1962: Sigismund von Radecki
 1965: Ernst Jünger; Sponsorship award: Astrid Gehlhoff-Claes
 1967: Wolfgang Koeppen; Sponsorship award: Johannes Poethen

German literary awards